The 2016 Castrol Gold Coast 600 was a motor racing event for Supercars, held on the weekend of 21 to 23 October 2016. The event was held at the Surfers Paradise Street Circuit in Surfers Paradise, Queensland, and consisted of two races of 300 kilometres in length. It was the twelfth event of fourteen in the 2016 International V8 Supercars Championship and hosted Races 22 and 23 of the season. It was also the third and final event of the 2016 Enduro Cup. It was the seventh running of the Gold Coast 600.

Report

Practice

Results

Race 22

Qualifying

Race

Race 23

Qualifying

Top Ten Shootout

Race

Championship standings after the event 
 After Race 23 of 29. Only the top five positions are included for both sets of standings.

Drivers' Championship standings

Teams' Championship standings

References 

Castrol Gold Coast 600
Motorsport in Queensland
Castrol Gold Coast 600